The dirham, dirhem or dirhm is a silver unit of currency historically and currently used by several Arab and Arab influenced states. The term has also been used as a related unit of mass.

Unit of mass
The dirham was a unit of weight used across North Africa, the Middle East, Persia and Ifat; later known as Adal, with varying values.

The value of Islamic dirham was  14 qirat, 10 dirham = 7 mithqal, in Islamic law (2.975 gm of silver). 

In the late Ottoman Empire, the standard dirham was 3.207 g; 400 dirhem equal one oka. The Ottoman dirham was based on the Sasanian drachm (in Middle Persian: drahm), which was itself based on the Roman dram/drachm.

In Egypt in 1895, it was equivalent to 47.661 troy grains (3.088 g).

There is currently a movement within the Islamic world to revive the dirham as a unit of mass for measuring silver, although the exact value is disputed (either 3 or 2.975 grams).

History

The word "dirham" ultimately comes from drachma (δραχμή), the Greek coin. The Greek-speaking Byzantine Empire controlled the Levant and traded with Arabia, circulating the coin there in pre-Islamic times and afterward. It was this currency which was initially adopted as a Persian word (Middle Persian drahm or dram); then near the end of the 7th century the coin became an Islamic currency bearing the name of the sovereign and a religious verse. The "dirham" was the coin of the Persians. The Arabs introduced their own coins.
The Islamic dirham was 8 daniq.  The dirham was struck in many Mediterranean countries, including Al-Andalus (Moorish Spain) and the Byzantine Empire (miliaresion), and could be used as currency in Europe between the 10th and 12th centuries, notably in areas with Viking connections, such as Viking York and Dublin.

Dirham in Jewish orthodox law
The dirham is frequently mentioned in Jewish orthodox law as a unit of weight used to measure various requirements in religious functions, such as the weight in silver specie pledged in Marriage Contracts (Ketubbah), the quantity of flour requiring the separation of the dough-portion, etc. Jewish physician and philosopher, Maimonides, uses the Egyptian dirham to approximate the quantity of flour for dough-portion, writing in Mishnah Eduyot 1:2: "And I found the rate of the dough-portion in that measurement to be approximately five-hundred and twenty dirhams of wheat flour, while all these dirhams are the Egyptian [dirham]." This view is repeated by Maran's Shulhan Arukh (Hil. Hallah, Yoreh Deah § 324:3) in the name of the Tur. In Maimonides' commentary of the Mishnah (Eduyot 1:2, note 18), Rabbi Yosef Qafih explains that the weight of each Egyptian dirham was approximately 3.333 grams,  or what was the equivalent to 16 carob-grains which, when taken together, the minimum weight of flour requiring the separation of the dough-portion comes to approx. 1 kilo and 733 grams. Rabbi Ovadiah Yosef, in his Sefer Halikhot ʿOlam (vol. 1, pp. 288–291), makes use of a different standard for the Egyptian dirham, saying that it weighed approx. 3.0 grams, meaning the minimum requirement for separating the priest's portion is 1 kilo and 560 grams. Others (e.g. Rabbi Avraham Chaim Naeh) say the Egyptian dirham weighed approx. 3.205 grams, which total weight for the requirement of separating the dough-portion comes to 1 kilo and 666 grams. Rabbi Shelomo Qorah (Chief Rabbi of Bnei Barak) wrote that the traditional weight used in Yemen for each dirham weighed 3.20 grams for a total of 31.5 dirhams given as the redemption of one's firstborn son (pidyon haben), or 3.36 grams for the 30 dirhams required by the Shulhan Arukh (Yoreh De'ah 305:1), and which in relation to the separation of the dough-portion made for a total weight of 1 kilo and 770.72 grams.

The word drachmon, used in some translations of Maimonides' commentary of the Mishnah, has in all places the same connotation as dirham.

Modern-day currency 
Currently the valid national currencies with the name dirham are:

Modern currencies with the subdivision dirham or diram are:

The unofficial modern gold dinar, issued and/or proposed by several states and proto-states, is also divided into dirhams.

See also

Dinar
Gold dinar
Fals

References

Denominations (currency)
Silver coins
Obsolete units of measurement
Ottoman units of measurement
Units of mass
Islamic banking
Islamic banking and finance terminology
Medieval currencies